Cockburn's Port is a port wine producer in Portugal. 

Cockburn's was set up by Scotsman Robert Cockburn in 1815, who returned to Portugal after first visiting the country as a soldier fighting under Wellington in the Napoleonic Wars. It later became a major brand of port in the 19th and 20th centuries.

In 1962, the family sold the company to Harvey's of Bristol, which itself then became part of Allied Domecq until 2005, when Allied Domecq was taken over by Pernod Ricard, which sold Cockburn's and some other brands to the Fortune Brands holding company (the parent company of Beam Global). In 2010 Cockburn's was sold to Symington Family Estates, a family-owned business that owns over 1,006 hectares (2,400 acres) of vineyards in the Douro valley.

See also
 Churchill's Port

References

External links
 Cockburn's

Portuguese brands
Wineries of Portugal
Companies established in 1815
Port wine